Elizabeth Glendinning Kirkwood Hewat (16 September 1895 – 13 October 1968) was the first woman to graduate BD and PhD at New College, University of Edinburgh, a missionary, a campaigner for women's equality in the Church of Scotland, and an historian of Scottish missions.

Life and career 
Hewat was born on 16 September 1895 in Prestwick, Scotland to Elizabeth Glendinning and the Rev. Kirkwood Hewat, the United Free Church minister at Prestwick. Her education began at the girls' school Wellington School in Ayr and she went on to gain an MA at the University of Edinburgh in history and philosophy.

Her first academic position was as assistant lecturer in history at the University of St Andrews. She then moved to the UFC Women's Missionary College in Edinburgh where she taught between 1922 and 1926. In Edinburgh, she was one of the first women to study at New College and became the first woman to graduate BD from the college in 1926, coming top of her class.

Hewat believed that in order to fully prepare for missionary work that she should be ordained by the church. This led to a debate on women's ordination during the 1926 United Free Church General Assembly, however, the motion was not passed. Vera Kenmure was ordained and became a pastor in Partick's Congegational church in 1928 and she was ordained in 1929.

Hewat continued to argue for women's equality in the Christian church, writing in 1931, "women in the church hold a subordinate position; and women of today ask why ... Of one thing they are certain, and it is this, that it is not Christ who is barring the way."

Despite the refusal of ordination, Hewat began her missionary work by joining her sister in China. Once there, she was a teaching missionary and followed her own scholarly interests by researching comparative literature in Hebrew and Confucian Wisdom. Following her time in China, she returned to Edinburgh to work as an unpaid assistant at North Merchiston Church and to complete her PhD at the University of Edinburgh.

In 1935, she moved to Mumbai to become Professor of History at Wilson College and remained there until 1956. She was an elder in the United Church of North India.

After her return to Scotland, Hewat died on 13 October 1968 in Edinburgh and was buried in Comely Bank Cemetery.

Works

References

Further reading 
 Elizabeth L. Ewan; Sue Innes; Sian Reynolds; Rose Pipes (2006). The Biographical Dictionary of Scottish Women. Edinburgh University Press. pp. 166–167. .
 Macdonald, Lesley Orr (2000). A Unique and Glorious Mission: Women and Presbyterianism in Scotland 1830 to 1930. John Donald. .

People educated at Wellington School, Ayr
Alumni of the University of Edinburgh
1895 births
1968 deaths
Female Christian missionaries
People from Prestwick
Presbyterian missionaries in China
Scottish Presbyterian missionaries
British expatriates in China
Scottish historians
Scottish missionaries